Dickson Field  is a private airport located  east of Oroville, Washington, which is a city in the Okanogan region of United States. It provides private general aviation services and has a  runway numbered 17–35, but the nearby Dorothy Scott Airport handles most of the city's aviation services.

History 
It is owned and operated by Robert Dickson, serving the Okanogan area itself. As it is a private airport, permission is required prior to landing at the Dickson Field. Rights for permanent public use of the Dickson Field were approved in January 2007. The airport obtained no passengers in 2011.

No accidents or incidents have occurred at the Dickson Field throughout its history. Dorothy Scott Airport, a public airport situated in the same city, is generally used for the city's public aviation services, having been classified as an airport of entry by the Federal Aviation Administration.

Facilities 
The airport maintains no facilities or services, and is generally used for private general aviation services. Its airfield has a  runway numbered 17–35. The nearest radio navigation aids from the airport that help the pilot are located in three cities: Omak, Penticton, Naramata.

See also 

 List of airports in Washington

References

External links 

Airports in Washington (state)
Transportation buildings and structures in Okanogan County, Washington